The Seven Lively Arts was a series of seven paintings created by the Spanish surrealist painter Salvador Dalí in 1944 and, after they were lost in a fire in 1956, recreated in an updated form by Dalí in 1957. The paintings depicted the seven arts of dancing, opera, ballet, music, cinema, radio/television and theatre.

Background
In 1944, as the Second World War was drawing to a conclusion, the impresario Billy Rose, who had bought the Ziegfeld Theatre and converted it back from a cinema to a theater, decided to put on a musical revue, with music by Cole Porter and Igor Stravinski, entitled the Seven Lively Arts. As an additional attraction he commissioned Salvador Dalí to create the original series of seven artworks for display in the theatre lobby. They were painted on site by Dalí in a second floor room. The show ran for 183 performances after which the paintings remained on display for a further ten years, where they were photographed by Life magazine, albeit in black and white. They were then removed to hang in Rose's mansion, Mount Kisco, in New York State. Two years later they were all destroyed in a fire, along with other works of art.

In 1957 Dalí, as an act of gratitude and friendship, offered to recreate the paintings, in an updated form, for the same price as the originals. They were initially hung in Rose's Manhattan apartment, but later dispersed to a number of private collections.

Works

 Dance
 Original: The Art of Boogie-Woogie  Gala-Salvador Dalí Foundation
 Recreation: Rock 'n Roll, Morohashi Museum of Modern Art, Fukushima, Japan  Gala-Salvador Dalí Foundation (once owned by the Escobar family in Colombia) 

Opera
 Original: The Art of Opera  Gala-Salvador Dalí Foundation
 Recreation: The Grand Opera Gala-Salvador Dalí Foundation

Ballet
 Original: The Art of Ballet  Gala-Salvador Dalí Foundation
 Recreation: Metamorphosed Women Gala-Salvador Dalí Foundation

Music
 Original: The Art of Concert  Gala-Salvador Dalí Foundation
 Recreation: Red Orchestra, Nahmad collection Gala-Salvador Dalí Foundation

Cinema
 Original: The Art of Cinema  Gala-Salvador Dalí Foundation
 Recreation: Celestial Ride  Gala-Salvador Dalí Foundation

Radio/Television
 Original: The Art of Radio  Gala-Salvador Dalí Foundation 
 Recreation: Modern Rhapsody  Gala-Salvador Dalí Foundation

Theater
 Original: The Art of Theater  Gala-Salvador Dalí Foundation
 Recreation: Bewitchment or Sorcery   Gala-Salvador Dalí Foundation

References

External links
 The Salvador Dalí Paintings That Went Up In Flames

Paintings by Salvador Dalí
Surrealist paintings
1944 paintings
1957 paintings
Spanish art
Dance in art